Giovanna Bersola (born 20 July 1972), better known by her stage name Jenny B, is an Italian singer.

Biography  
Bersola was born in 1972 in Catania, Sicily, Italy, to a Sicilian mother and Senegalese father. In the early years of her music career, she mostly did session work. She is best known for her feature vocal in the Italian Eurodance group Corona's 1993 hit, "The Rhythm of the Night", and also in the Italian Eurodance Playahitty 1994 hit "The Summer Is Magic". 

In 2000, she won the "Newcomers Section" and the Mia Martini Critics Award of the Sanremo Music Festival with her song, "Semplice Sai".

Discography 
Singles
 "Wanna Get Your Love" (1993)
 "There's A Bit Goin' On" (1993)
 "Semplice Sai" (2000)
 "Shine Into My Life" (with Stefano Gamma, 1999)
 "Toccami l'Anima" (2000)
 "Come Un Sogno" (2000)
 "Anche Tu" (2001)
 "Ode a Celeste" (2011)
 "Canto madrigal" (2011)

Albums 
 Come Un Sogno (2000)
 Jenny B In Concert (2007)
 Esta soy yo (2011)

 Featured as a vocalist 
J.K. - "You Make Me Feel Good" (1992)
J.K. - "Beat It" (1993)
Corona - "The Rhythm of the Night" (1993)
J.K. - ″You And I″ (1994)
Nevada - "Take Me To Heaven" (1994)
Playahitty - "The Summer Is Magic" (1994) 
Libra - "Closer to Me" (1995)
Playahitty - "1, 2, 3! (Train With Me)" (1995)
Red Velvet - "Lady Don't Cry" (1995)
Funky Company - "Tendency Of Love" (album, 1996)
Funky Company - "Everytime" (1998)
Gemelli Diversi - "Un attimo ancora" (1998)
Gemelli Diversi - "Tunaizdanait" (1998)
Benny Bee - "Waiting For You" (1999)
S-Sense feat. Jenny B - "Gonna Get Your Love" (1999)
Er Piotta feat. Jenny B - "La Mossa Del Giaguaro" (2000)
Tofunk - "Alright" (2000)
Funbeat feat. Jenny B - "A Part Of Me" (2001)
Simpson Tune feat. Jenny B - "Bring It Down" (2001)
The Wikkamen Project feat. Jenny B - "Down On It" (2001)
FR feat. Jenny B - "Love Is The Music" (2002)
Alan Sorrenti feat. Jenny B - "Paradiso Beach" (2003)
J.F.C. feat. Jenny B - "Meet Me In Paradise" (2003)
La Perla feat. Jenny B - "The Difference between Me & U" (2004)
Private Show feat. Jenny B - "The Difference Between Me & You" (2004)
Massimo Ranieri feat. Jenny B - "La voce del silenzio" (2006)
Eric Daniel feat. Jenny B - "Old sax nu soul" (2006)
Stylus Robb feat. Jenny B - "Step Side To Side" (2007)
Favretto feat. Jenny B - "First Floor" (2008)
Favretto feat. Jenny B - "To The Beat" (2008)
Marracash feat. Jenny B - "Solo io e te" (2009)
Alessandro Magnanini feat. Jenny B - "Secret Lover"/"Open Up Your Eyes"/"So Long, Goodbye" (2009)
Culture Beat - "Your Love" (2009)
Rudeejay & Freaks Jam feat. Jenny B - "The Rhythm Is Magic" (2011)
Afa Connection feat. Jenny B - "Found Love" (2012)
Dj's Tribute Family feat. Jenny B - "What's Up?" (2012)
Ultraclub 90 - "Rhythm Of The Night" (2018)

References

External links
MySpace site

 

1972 births
Living people
Italian dance musicians
 Italian people of Senegalese descent
 Sanremo Music Festival winners of the newcomers section
 Musicians from Catania
21st-century Italian singers
21st-century Italian women singers
Italian Italo disco musicians